Bua Airport, also known as Palopo Lagaligo Airport , is an airport in Luwu Regency, South Sulawesi, Sulawesi Island, Indonesia. It serves the city of Palopo, which is located 10 km from the airport itself. The airport has a land area of about 100 hectares. To accommodate larger aircraft, the airport's facility was upgraded in 2015. With a budget allocation of Rp 25 billion, the government has fixed a number of supporting facilities including runways which have now been extended to 1,400 m x 30 m. In addition, the airport is now equipped with a taxiway with a length of 191 meters and a width of 18 meters, and an apron which has a length of 80 meters and a width of 60 meters. Runway lights have been added to allow aircraft to land at night. A fence surrounding the airport has been added to prevent animals from entering the grounds.

Bua Airport is equipped with a representative passenger terminal, which has a furnished departure lounge, arrival lounge, baggage claim area, VIP room, and a five-star hotel standard toilet. The airport has a power house equipped with three engine generators ready to operate automatically during blackouts. The airport has been strengthened with an electric power of 131 kVA. The airport also has an accident rescue and firefighting building.

Facilities
It has one runway designated 17/35 with an asphalt surface measuring 1,400 m x 30 m (4593 ft × 98 ft).

Airlines and destinations

The following destinations are served from Palopo Lagaligo Airport:

References

Airports in South Sulawesi